Chakkarat station is a railway station located in Chakkarat Subdistrict, Chakkarat District, Nakhon Ratchasima Province.

References 

Railway stations in Thailand
Nakhon Ratchasima province